Neville Edwards (born 5 November 1941) is a South African cricketer. He played in three first-class matches for Border in 1965/66.

See also
 List of Border representative cricketers

References

External links
 

1941 births
Living people
South African cricketers
Border cricketers
Cricketers from East London, Eastern Cape